A credit circle is created when members of a common group, typically a trade association or federation, come together to share information on credit related matters of their customers, such as late payers or bad debtors. Credit Circles traditionally would meet together on a fairly regular basis, although some now share information online to allow each member to carry out a real time credit check on any new customers.

See also
Credit Bureau
Credit risk

Credit